The Mopria Alliance was formed in September 2013, with the four founding members, all among the world's largest printer manufacturers, including Canon, HP, Samsung, and Xerox. According to their mission statement, "the Mopria Alliance provides universal standards and solutions for scan and print."

Member companies have published certifications for mobile devices, mobile print accessories, and 6,000+ printer models from 24 brands, representing more than 120 million print devices in use today. There are more than 3 billion installations of Mopria print technology, including user installations of the Mopria Print Service application and as part of factory-installed print apps on mobile devices from multiple manufacturers, including Samsung, Huawei, Amazon and ZTE. Mopria print technology is also integrated in the Android Default Print Service offered in Android 8 and higher.

Mopria member companies 

Member companies include leading mobile device providers, software application vendors, printer and scanner manufacturers and OS providers.

 Canon Inc. (founder)
 HP Inc. (founder)
 Samsung Electronics (founder)
 Xerox (founder)
 Adobe Inc.
 Brother Industries
 EFI
 Epson
 FUJIFILM Business Innovation Corp.
 Konica Minolta
 Kyocera
 Lexmark
 Microsoft
 OKI Data
 Pantum
 Primax 
 Qualcomm
 Ricoh
 Toshiba

Mopria Universal Standards
Mopria Alliance develops standards offering a simple and seamless way to print or scan to any Mopria certified printer, multi-function printer or scanner. The standards are available to Mopria Alliance member companies.

Mopria Print Service 
The Mopria Print Service for Android was released in the Google Play store in October 2014. It is a plug-in that enables printing from Android devices to Mopria certified printers and MFPs.

A client uses mDNS to automatically discover a printer through the local 802.11 wireless network. The printer must be connected to the network either wirelessly or with an Ethernet cable.  Mopria Print Service also supports printer connection through Wi-Fi Direct.

Mopria Print Library
The Mopria Print Library enables third-party plug-ins and provides support for a vast range of printers from multiple vendors.  The Mopria Print Library is part of the Samsung Print Service by HP, giving Samsung Galaxy users the ability to print content from their devices.

Android Default Print Service
Mopria core print technology is integrated in the Android Default Print Service offered in Android 8 and higher.

Windows support for Mopria certified printers
Microsoft implemented an IPP printing solution based on the Mopria print standard enabling Windows to support Mopria certified printers.

Windows Server Hybrid Cloud Print
Hybrid Cloud Print consists of Discovery service endpoint running on an IIS service supporting Mopria Alliance industry standard for printer discovery in the cloud.

Mopria Scan
Mopria Scan provides a complete scan solution and universal standard that is compatible with scan devices from most manufacturers.

Mopria organization
The Mopria Alliance was formed as a Delaware non-profit membership corporation and operates as a 501(c)(6) nonprofit corporation. Representatives from member organizations can serve on the board of directors and the three primary working groups: technical, certification, and marketing.

References

External links

Computer printing
Organizations established in 2013
Technology organizations